Municipal is the adjective of municipality.

Municipal may also refer to:

 Municipal bond, or "muni", a financial bond issued in the United States and in other countries
 Municipalization, the transfer of non-municipal assets to municipal ownership
 Municipal law, the law governing the internal affairs of a country, as opposed to international law

Sports

 C.S.D. Municipal, a football club from Guatemala City
 Deportivo Municipal, a football club from Lima, Peru
 Once Municipal, a football club from Ahuachapán, El Salvador
 Club Social y Deportivo Municipal, a sports club from Corrientes, Argentina